Gerard Sutton is an Australian ophthalmic surgeon and ophthalmologist in Australia and New Zealand. His specialty is laser vision correction, cataract and lens surgery, and corneal transplantation.

Education  

Sutton graduated in medicine from the University of New South Wales.   After completing his ophthalmic training at Sydney Eye Hospital, he completed advanced surgical training at St Thomas’ and Moorfields Eye Hospitals in London.  He followed this with a fellowship in laser vision correction surgery at the Friedrich Alexander University in Erlangen, Germany in 1996.

Career and research 
In 2010, Sutton became the inaugural Professor of Corneal and Refractive Surgery at the Sydney Eye Hospital and the University of Sydney. Here he established and continues to supervise the first university degree in the world for refractive vision correction surgery training.  He also holds a clinical associate professor position at Auckland University.   He continues to see patients as a partner at Vision Eye Institute, Chatswood. In late 2013, Sutton co-authored a book, “The Naked Eye”, with Dr Michael Lawless. The book provided an overview of laser refractive and lens surgery options for prospective patients and health practitioners in optometry and ophthalmology.

He has developed local and international collaborative research relationships across ophthalmology and medical science. Recently with Professor Gordon Wallace of the University of Wollongong, the team developed a novel treatment for the repair of corneal wounds. This technology has several opportunities within ophthalmology and the potential to address wound healing throughout the body. As recognition of the invention’s potential, Gerard Sutton and the team secured several significant grants in excess of $1M, including from New South Wales Health Big Idea and NSW Medical Device Fund grants.

Gerard Sutton’s involvement in the Myanmar Eye Care Project has been pivotal in helping to develop the community ophthalmic and corneal transplant service in Myanmar and represents an ongoing commitment to development of ophthalmic services in third-world countries. This work was recognised in receiving the XOVA Excellence in Ophthalmology award in 2015 for developing the service in Myanmar. By overseeing the training and development of local ophthalmologists and alongside the organisation of continued government and education support, the program has become self-sufficient tripling the amount of corneal surgical procedures in less than a decade.

He has performed over 20,000 surgical procedures in cornea, cataract and refractive surgery. Sutton has lectured continually on a wide variety of topics within ophthalmology both at home and abroad. In 2018 he was won the individual and team gold medals at the Cataract Olympic Marathon session at the World Ophthalmology Conference in Barcelona, Spain.  He has published over 100 peer-reviewed papers and textbook chapters.  He has co-authored two books on Keratoconus and Refractive Surgery. He was the Chief Ophthalmologist for the 2000 Olympics.

References 

Living people
Year of birth missing (living people)
Australian ophthalmologists